Preussiodora is a genus of plants in the family Rubiaceae. It contains only one species, Preussiodora sulphurea, native to central Africa (Nigeria, Cameroon, Gabon, Congo-Brazzaville, Congo-Kinshasa, and the islands in the Gulf of Guinea).

The genus name of Preussiodora is in honour of Paul Rudolf Preuss (1861–1926), a German botanist and researcher. He founded and directed a botanical garden in Kamerun (now called Cameroon). The Latin specific epithet of sulphurea means sulphur-yellow. Both the genus and the species were first described and published in Bull. Jard. Bot. État Bruxelles Vol.28 on pages 31–32 in 1958.

References 

Monotypic Rubiaceae genera
Taxa named by Ronald William John Keay
Gardenieae
Plants described in 1958
Flora of Cameroon
Flora of Gabon
Flora of Nigeria
Flora of the Republic of the Congo